The Harbin Clinic is the largest privately owned multispecialty medical clinic in Rome, Georgia.

The Harbin Clinic was founded in 1948 as the successor to the Harbin Hospital that was founded in 1908 by Drs. W.P. and R.M. Harbin.  The Harbin Clinic now has more than 27 satellite offices throughout Rome, Adairsville, Bremen, Calhoun, Cartersville, Cedartown, Summerville, and Trion.

History

Dr. Robert Maxwell Harbin (1864–1939) received his medical training at Bellevue Hospital Medical College of New York City, and first practiced medicine with his father, Dr. Wylie Reeder Harbin, in Calhoun, Georgia in 1888. In 1894, Robert moved to Rome, Georgia, and established his own practice.

Dr. William Pickens Harbin (1872–1942) ("Dr. Will"), earned his Medical Doctorate in 1897, also from the Bellevue Hospital Medical College. His brother Robert invited him to join his practice in Rome, where Will first arrived in 1898. However, Will soon accepted a commission as acting assistant surgeon in the United States Army during the Spanish–American War.

After the war, in 1901, Will returned to Rome and the Harbin brothers' first practice was located on the second floor at 206 Broad Street, and they employed two horse & buggy drivers to keep buggies ready to race the doctors to the homes of patients with medical emergencies. The fee for an office visit was usually $1, and the fees for home visits were $2 to $3, but payments were often delayed until the cotton crops came in. Common health problems included smallpox, diphtheria, typhoid, pellagra, tuberculosis and diabetes, with diagnosis depending on active symptoms, physical findings, and sputum examinations.

In 1908, Robert and Will founded the Harbin Hospital with 12 beds by converting a house at the Southeastern corner of Third Avenue and First Street. In 1911 they established a training program for nurses, and in 1919, a new four-story fire-proof hospital building was constructed next door, and the original hospital was converted into a nurses' dormitory.

Also in 1919, Harbin Hospital acquired an X-Ray machine and became one of the first hospitals in the country to offer radiation treatment for cancer.

In 1920, three stories were added to the hospital, expanding the bed capacity to 75 and making it the tallest building in Rome at the time. Many modern systems were included, such as steam heating, electrical lights, silent call systems, hot and cold running water in each room, linoleum floors, three complete operating suites, a private telephone exchange, and a safe-gate elevator running from basement to roof. The next year, the hospital was recognized by the American College of Surgeons as one of four hospitals in Georgia to meet the board's standards of excellence.

In 1925, the Harbin Hospital introduced what was then an innovative orthopedic program of following the treatment of bone fractures with physiotherapy (known today as physical therapy). Other innovations in following years included Dr. Will Harbin performing the first Caesarean section ever done in Floyd County, the first blood matching and blood transfusion in the county, and the first X-ray camera in Rome used for the first bone and dental films.

By the time Robert died in 1939 and was buried in Myrtle Hill Cemetery, many other physicians had been added to the staff, and in the 1930s and 1940s, a new generation of Harbin doctors joined, including Robert Jr. and 3 sons of Will: William Jr., Bannester, and Thomas. William died in 1942 and was also buried in Myrtle Hill Cemetery.

In 1948, Harbin Hospital was transformed into the Harbin Clinic by eliminating overnight care, which was effectively replaced by the expansion of the Floyd County Hospital to 120 beds. At this time the building was renovated and an air-conditioning system was added, the Harbin Hospital School of Nursing was terminated, and the nurses' dormitory was razed to increase parking space.

Since then, the Harbin Clinic has continued to expand, and is Georgia’s largest privately owned, multi-specialty physician clinic, with an 11-county referral base consisting of Bartow, Chattooga, Cherokee, Floyd, Gordon, Haralson, Polk, Walker, and Paulding counties in Georgia and Cherokee and DeKalb counties in Alabama. The clinic also has more than 20 satellite offices are throughout Rome, Calhoun, Cartersville, Cedartown, Adairsville, Summerville and Bremen.

Harbin Clinic was affiliated with PhyCor, Inc, a medical management company based in Nashville, TN from 1996 to 2000. Upon PhyCor's reorganization, Harbin repurchased its assets and regained its independent status.

Departments 
The Harbin Clinic offers a wide variety of departments, including:

 Acupuncture
 Audiology
 Bariatric Center
 Behavioral Sciences
 Cancer Center
 Cardiac Rehabilitation
 Cardiology
 Cardiology-Pediatrics
 Cardiothoracic Surgery
 Chiropractic Medicine
 Clinical Research
 Dermatology
 Diabetes Management Center
 Endocrinology
 Family Practice
 Gastroenterology
 General Surgery
 Imaging Center
 Immediate Care
 Infectious Diseases
 Internal Medicine
 Laboratory
 Medical Oncology
 Nephrology
 Neurology
 Neurosurgery
 Obstetrics/Gynecology
 Ophthalmology
 Optometry
 Orthopaedics
 Otolaryngology
 Pediatrics
 Pharmatrend Infusions
 Plastic Surgery Center
 Pulmonary Function Lab
 Pulmonary Medicine
 Radiation Oncology
 Retired Physicians
 Rheumatology
 Sleep Disorders Center
 Spine & Pain Center
 Travel and Tropical Medicine Services
 Urology
 Vascular Lab
 Vascular Surgery & Endovascular Interventions
 Vein Center

References

External links 
 The Harbin Clinic

Clinics in the United States
Medical and health organizations based in Georgia (U.S. state)
Privately held companies based in Georgia (U.S. state)
1908 establishments in Georgia (U.S. state)